The ZSSK Class 350 (prior to 1988: ČSD Class ES 499.0) is an electric locomotive of the Železničná spoločnosť Slovensko (Slovakian Railway Company) and previously of the Československé státní dráhy (Czechoslovak State Railways). Introduced in 1974, they became the first dual-system locomotives in Czechoslovakia, and have been used to haul express trains on the Bratislava - Prague railway corridor since then.

They are nicknamed "Gorilla" among railfans due to this locomotive being featured in 1989 on a postage stamp of Guinea-Bissau.

Accidents 
The driver of the Meridian was killed after falling out of the locomotive and another 21 persons were injured. The locomotive had only travelled  at the time of the accident, and was eventually scrapped after a year and a half in service. The accident's causes are still unknown to this day due to the death of the train driver but he had unexplainably accelerated between Lamač and the tunnels just north of the railway station. The investigative committee and the railway workers eventually got involved in lengthy polemics in their attempts to find an explanation for the accident; the committee blamed the accident on the brake failiure while the railwaymen believed the cause to be something else.
The accident led to 6 deaths and 58 injuries; the train was lightly loaded due to the fall of the Berlin Wall that had happened a few hours earlier. The locomotive was scrapped, along with the first 6 cars of the express train. The accident was caused by the poor functioning of the in-cab alerter system.
 23 January 2013: 350 011 was hauling the westbound Kriváň (IC 507,  to Bratislava hl. st.) when it hit a snowplow truck at a level crossing near Liptovský Mikuláš, leading to the death of a 50 year old train driver, Ján Šarudi. The locomotive was out in service for a year until it was repaired by ŽOS Vrútky and re-entered service in 2014.

References

External links 
 Lokomotivní řada 350 (ES 499.0) | Atlas Lokomotiv (in Czech)

Škoda locomotives
Electric locomotives of Czechoslovakia
Electric locomotives of Slovakia